The 1974–75 Syracuse Orangemen basketball team represented Syracuse University in the 1974–75 NCAA Division I men's basketball season.  The Head coach was Roy Danforth, serving for his 7th year. The team played home games at Manley Field House in Syracuse, New York.  Syracuse reached the Final Four of the NCAA tournament – the first in program history – and finished with a 23–9 record.

Roster

Schedule and results

|-
!colspan=9 style=| Regular season

|-
!colspan=9 style=| ECAC Tournament

|-
!colspan=9 style=| NCAA Tournament

Rankings

NBA Draft

References

Syracuse
Syracuse Orange men's basketball seasons
NCAA Division I men's basketball tournament Final Four seasons
Syracuse
Syracuse Orange
Syracuse Orange